Karoon Jarupianlerd (born 15 August 1985), who boxes as Petchbarngborn Kokietgym or Petchbarngborn Sor Thanapinyo (เพชรบางบอน ก่อเกียรติยิม, เพชรบางบอน ส.ธนภิญโญ), is a Thai professional boxer in Super flyweight division.

Biography & career
Karoon (nickname: Gap; แก๊ป) was born in Khwaeng Bang Bon (currently Bang Bon District), Bang Khun Thian District in Thonburi side, Bangkok. He started his career with Muay Thai in childhood. His father, Wissanuchai "Hua Taxi" Jarupianlerd, is the owner of Muay Thai gym and manager to many Muay Thai fighters. Wissanuchai believed that Karoon wouldn't be successful in Muay Thai so he let his son change to professional boxing under Sor Thanapinyo Gym, and Karoon won the Rajadamnern Stadium Light flyweight title in 2009.

He had many chances to travel and box abroad, but he lost more than he won. Wissanuchai also brought Karoon under Kokiet "Sia Ko" Panichyarom of Kokiet Group. He became famous for wins over fellow Thai Wandee Singwancha, a former WBC Minimumweight world champion and won WBC Asia Super flyweight in 2011.

On June 4, 2016, he competed with Paul Butler, a British boxer at Echo Arena Liverpool, Liverpool, Merseyside, England in eliminator fight for the winner to challenge WBO Super flyweight title with a Japanese holder, Naoya Inoue. But the fight was canceled, because Butler can't weight himself in 115 pounds, according to the rules.

However, Karoon was also allowed to fight with Inoue on September 4 of the same year at Sky Arena, Zama, Japan by Chatchai Sasakul, a former WBC Flyweight champion as trainer. The result is that he is defeated TKO (referee stops contest) in the 10th round, because he was knocked down one time and not in the state to continue.

Titles
Regional & International Titles:
Rajadamnern Stadium Light flyweight Champion  (November 2009) (108 lbs)
ABCO Super flyweight Champion (May 2011)  (115 lbs)
WBA Asia Super flyweight Champion (October 2012) (115 lbs)
WBO Oriental Super flyweight Champion (June 2013) (115 lbs)
WBO Asia pacific Super flyweight Champion (July 2014) (115 lbs)
PABA Super flyweight Champion (January 2017) (115 lbs)

References

External links
 

1985 births
Living people
Petchbarngborn Kokietgym
Petchbarngborn Kokietgym
Light-flyweight boxers
Super-flyweight boxers